Ronald J. Hargrave (born November 8, 1929) is a well renowned ukulele player and actor from the 1950s era, who has become an icon to the Rockabilly fan base. He co-wrote music for Jerry Lee Lewis and was also identified as a billboard star musician in Japan with many singles. He currently resides in Ventura, California where he visits small shops and locations to play the ukulele for small impromptu crowds.

Biography
Ron Hargrave was raised in the Bronx by Vaudeville performers directly after the big Wall Street Crash of 1929. His family, trying to avert disaster, moved to Hollywood, California in 1936, where they settled and he began his lifelong career choices for the entertainment industry.

He entered into military life right at the start of his acting and musical career. During his military service time, he met up with the daughter of Lou Costello, which started him off in the film industry.

He moved to Ventura County, California, where he resides near his daughter and continues to play music for small clubs and small audiences. He often surprises the downtown shop and small restaurant owners with impromptu visits where he plays his ukulele for passersby.

Career 
Ron Hargrave, after hanging out with Costello's daughter, met with Abbott and Costello and eventually was managed by Lou Costello in one film, Dance With Me Henry, released in 1956. He began writing songs and was introduced to Jerry Lee Lewis where he co-wrote High School Confidential (Jerry Lee Lewis song) and wrote "Latch On" and other movie songs.

He was also a boxer and his swagger in Costello's movie earmarked him as one of the first on-screen rock and roll actors, in an era that had not yet adjusted to the young attitude of Elvis Presley or Jerry Lee Lewis.

References

External links 
VC Star Interview with Ron Hargrave  (vcstar.com)

Displaying Ron Hargrave Drive In Record Fiend Lost Records. (record-fiend.blogspot.com)
Ron Hargrave Ventura Local Business Visits (ydek.us)

Rockabilly References (rockabilly.nl)
Ventura Local Businesses Visited by Ron Hargrave (ventura-computer-repair.com)

American rockabilly musicians
American male actors
1929 births
Living people
American ukulele players